Paolo Giobbe (10 January 1880 – 14 August 1972) was an Italian cardinal of the Catholic Church who served as Papal Datary in the Roman Curia from 1959 to 1968, and was elevated to the cardinalate in 1958.

Biography
Giobbe was born in Rome, and studied at the Pontifical Roman Seminary (from where he obtained doctorates in theology and canon law). He was ordained to the priesthood on 4 December 1904, and then did pastoral work in Rome until 1909. Made a Pontifical Ceremonery Supernumerary on 3 May 1909, Giobbe served as a censor of the Roman Liturgical Academy, minutant in the Sacred Congregation for the Propagation of the Faith, and an assistant at the Pontifical Urbaniana University from 1909 to 1918. In 1911, he was a Papal Ablegatus for the imposition of the red biretta on Cardinal Enrique Almaraz y Santos, Archbishop of Seville. Giobbe was raised to the rank of Domestic Prelate of His Holiness on 6 November 1917, and rector of the Pontifical Urbaniana University in 1918.

On 30 March 1925, Giobbe was appointed Nuncio to Colombia and Titular Archbishop of Ptolemais in Thebaide. He received his episcopal consecration on the following 26 April from Cardinal Pietro Gasparri, with Archbishop Tito Trocchi and Bishop Alessandro Fontana serving as co-consecrators, in the chapel of the Urbaniana. As his episcopal motto he chose: Haerere Christo – Remain with Christ. Giobbe was later named Internuncio, with title of nuncio ad personam, to the Netherlands on 12 August 1935, and created cardinal-priest of S. Maria in Vallicella by Pope John XXIII in the consistory of 15 December 1958. So he spent almost 25 years (except during the Second World War) in the Netherlands – for any nuncio an unusually long period.

Giobbe was made Papal Datary on 14 November 1959, and remained in that Curial post until it was suppressed on 1 January 1968. On 8 August 1961, he was made Cardinal Patron of the Sovereign Military Order of Malta. From 1962 to 1965, Giobbe attended the Second Vatican Council, during the course of which he participated in the 1963 papal conclave that selected Pope Paul VI.

Giobbe died in Rome, at age 92, as the oldest member of the College of Cardinals. He is buried in the chapel of the Congregation for the Evangelization of the Peoples at the Campo Verano.

References

External links
Cardinals of the Holy Roman Church
Catholic-Hierarchy 

20th-century Italian cardinals
Apostolic Nuncios to Colombia
Participants in the Second Vatican Council
1880 births
1972 deaths
Cardinals created by Pope John XXIII
Pontifical Roman Seminary alumni
Patrons of the Sovereign Military Order of Malta
Rectors of the Pontificio Collegio Urbano de Propaganda Fide